Petrachi is an Italian surname. Notable people with the surname include:

Bruno Petrachi (born 1997), Italian footballer
Davide Petrachi (born 1986), Italian footballer
Gianluca Petrachi (born 1969), Italian footballer

See also
Petrache

Italian-language surnames